Aulon was a settlement in ancient Attica, located near the Mines of Laurium. Its site is unlocated.

References

Populated places in ancient Attica
Former populated places in Greece